Peter and Wendy is a 2015 television film made for ITV in the UK. It was written by Adrian Hodges, directed by Diarmuid Lawrence and produced by Stewart Mackinnon and Christian Baute, Headline Pictures.

The film is based on the story of Peter Pan by J. M. Barrie, blending it with an original narrative set in the present day. The film draws a connection between the stories of Barrie and the real life Great Ormond Street Hospital, echoing sentiments shared by Barrie himself, who left all the rights to Peter Pan to the hospital in 1929, a few years before his death.

It was first broadcast on 26 December 2015.

Plot
Lucy is a teenage girl with a heart condition who is awaiting risky surgery that would save her life. Late in the night before her operation she reads a copy of Peter Pan and dreams she is Wendy and Peter Pan takes her to Neverland.

Cast
 Stanley Tucci as Captain Hook/Mr. Darling/Dr. Wylie
 Dan Tetsell as Ratcliffe/Dalton
 Laura Elphinstone as Starkey/Ali
 Rasmus Hardiker as Smee/Smith
 Gershwyn Eustache Jnr as Cecco/Yeboah
 Ricky Champ as Bill Jukes/Malik
 Asim Chaudhry as Mullins/Johnson
 Laura Fraser as Mrs. Darling/Julie Rose
 Hazel Doupe as Wendy Darling/Lucy Rose
 Natifa Mai as Tiger Lily/Jaya
 Zak Sutcliffe as Peter Pan
 Paloma Faith as Tinker Bell

Awards
The film won an International Emmy in 2016, and a Special Award for Best Director at the Parma Film Music Festival in 2016.

Reception
The film was generally well received by critics.

See also
 Great Ormond Street Hospital
 Peter Pan
 Peter and Wendy (novel)

References

External links
 Peter and Wendy - Official website of the film
 

2015 television films
2015 films
British television films
Peter Pan films